Association Sportive Achbal Ismailia Meknés, also called Ismailia Meknès is a Moroccan football club currently playing in the third division.

References
 GNFA 1 Unofficial Website

Football clubs in Morocco
Sports clubs in Morocco